Ossingen is a railway station in the Swiss canton of Zurich and municipality of Ossingen. The station is located on the Winterthur to Etzwilen line and is served by Zurich S-Bahn line S29, which links Winterthur and Stein am Rhein.

References

External links
 
 Ossingen station on Swiss Federal Railway's web site

Ossingen
Ossingen